Ichneutica petrograpta is a moth of the family Noctuidae. This species is endemic to New Zealand where it is found in the southwest districts of the South Island, including Westland, Otago Lakes and Fiordland. It is very similar in appearance to I. mutans. It inhabits tussock and shrubland in the alpine to subalpine zones. Adults of I. petrograpta are on the wing from December to February and are attracted to sugar traps. The life history of this species is unknown as are the host species of its larvae.

Taxonomy 
This species was described by Edward Meyrick in 1929 from a specimen collected by George Hudson near Lake Wakatipu in January. Meyrick named the species Melanchra petrograpta. The holotype specimen is held at the Natural History Museum, London. In 1988 J. S. Dugdale in his catalogue discussed this species under the genus Graphania. In 2019 Robert Hoare undertook a major review of New Zealand Noctuidae.  During this review the genus Ichneutica was greatly expanded and the genus Graphania was subsumed into that genus as a synonym. As a result of this review, this species is now known as Ichneutica petrograpta.

Description
Meyrick described the species as follows:

The male of this species has a wingspan of between 39 and 44 mm where as the female of the species has a wingspan of between 38 and 40 mm. I. petrograpta is very similar in appearance to I. mutans. Although females of these two species may be distinguished by markings on the forewings, males are more difficult to distinguish visually. When comparing the males of both species, I. petrograpta specimens are slightly darker in appearance and have antenna with slightly longer pectinations.

Distribution 
I. petrograpta is endemic to New Zealand. This species is found only in the southwest portion of the South Island in the districts of Westland, Otago Lakes and Fiordland.

Habitat 

This species inhabits tussock grasslands and shrublands in alpine and subalphine zones. This species has been observed at Mount Titiroa in tussock grasslands.

Behaviour 
Adults of this species are attracted to sugar traps and have also been collected with a mercury vapour moth trap. The adults of the species are on the wing from December to February.

Life history and host species 
The life history of this species is unknown as are the host species of the larvae.

References

Moths described in 1929
Hadeninae
Moths of New Zealand
Endemic fauna of New Zealand
Taxa named by Edward Meyrick
Endemic moths of New Zealand